Suru Suursoo is a bog in Harju County, Estonia. The bog is part of Põhja-Kõrvemaa Nature Reserve.

The area of the bog is 2557 ha.

References

Harju County
Bogs of Estonia